−2 may refer to:

 The negative of the number 2
 Negatives 2, a compilation album by Phantom Planet
 Dash 2, EMD Dash 2, a line of diesel-electric locomotives introduced by General Motors' Electro-Motive Division
 Minus two formula, a name for an attempt made by General Moeen U Ahmed to end political career of former Prime Ministers Begum Khaled Zia and Sheikh Hasina in Bangladesh

See also
 Minus minus, --, double dash
 Mega Man Legends 2, also known as Rockman Dash 2